S. H. Kress & Co. was the trading name of a chain of five and dime retail department stores in the United States  established by Samuel Henry Kress. It operated from 1896 to 1981. In the first half of the 20th century, there were Kress stores with ornamented architecture in hundreds of cities and towns.

History

Kress opened his first stationery and notions store in Nanticoke, Pennsylvania, in 1887. The chain of S. H. Kress & Co. 5-10-25 Cent Stores was established in 1896 in Memphis, Tennessee.  In the 1920s and 1930s, Kress sold a house label of phonograph records under the Romeo trademark. He died in 1955.
The company's exclusion of African Americans from its lunch counters made Kress a target for civil rights protests during the 1960 lunch counter sit-ins, along with Woolworth's, Rexall and other national chains. In Nashville, TN, Kress repeatedly refused to serve the protesters but eventually agreed to integrate the downtown store in reaction to a consumer boycott. The Greensboro, North Carolina Kress was included in the first civil rights demonstrations in the South. In Adickes v. S.H. Kress Co., the U.S. Supreme Court threw out convictions for vagrancy resulting from a sit-in at a Kress lunch counter in Mississippi. The Kress store in Baton Rouge was the site of that city's first civil rights sit-in. That event helped save it from demolition 45 years later.

In 1964, Genesco, Inc., acquired Kress. The company abandoned its center-city stores and moved to shopping malls. Genesco began liquidating Kress and closing down the Kress stores in 1980.  The remaining Kress stores were sold to McCrory Stores on January 1, 1981. Most continued to operate under the Kress name until McCrory Stores went out of business in 2001.

Tiendas Kress, the subsidiary chain in Puerto Rico, survived the parent company and is still in business there. The Kress Foundation, a philanthropic organization promoting art, was established by Kress in 1929 and also survives the parent company.

Architecture

The Kress chain was known for the architecture of its buildings. "Samuel H. Kress... envisioned his stores as works of public art that would contribute to the cityscape." A number of former Kress stores are recognized as architectural landmarks and many are listed on the National Register of Historic Places, including the 1913 building on Canal Street in New Orleans (now the New Orleans Ritz-Carlton) and  the 1929 neoclassical store in Asheville, North Carolina.

Notable Kress architects include Seymour Burrell, who studied in New York with  architect Emmanuel Louis Masqueray, and Edward Sibbert, who designed more than fifty Art Deco S. H. Kress & Co. stores between 1929 and 1944.

Sibbert's buildings streamlined the Kress image with a sleek buff modernity, the lavish use of terracotta ornament, and strong verticals supporting the golden letters "Kress". Curved glass display windows led the shopper through heavy bronze doors into an interior of rich marbles, fine woods, and large customized counters set crosswise down a long sales floor. Well-positioned hanging lamps created a bright atmosphere for an endless array of inexpensive items (there were 4,275 different articles on sale in 1934). Everything – from the constantly restocked merchandise to the gracious retiring rooms and popular soda fountain in the basement – encouraged customers to linger. Like the great movie houses of the day, the dime store – and ‘Kress’s’ in particular – was a popular destination during hard economic times.

Sibbert's Mayan Revival Kress store on Fifth Avenue in New York City was built in 1935 and demolished in 1980.

A seven-story marble structure designed for every shopping comfort, its Art Deco elegance was graced by airborne Mayan gods on the sales floor and Mayan-style hieroglyphs of the gloves and padlocks and yard goods for sale. Awarded a gold medal for architectural quality, the store represented the zenith of the Kress empire in luxury, modernity, and retailing capacity.

The downtown Kress store in Greensboro, North Carolina, is a characteristic example that shows the chain's use of elaborate exterior details including coats-of-arms, metal work, and inlaid artistic flourishes on the keystones and corners.

The National Building Museum in Washington, D.C., holds a permanent collection of Kress building "records, including thousands of drawings and photographs relating to the design, construction, and operation of more than 200 stores stretching from New York to Hawaii."

Reuse of Kress buildings
Kress buildings around the country have been adapted for reuse.

 Albuquerque, NM: A new owner has purchased the Kress building, intends to make it a space for all arts Kress building in Albuquerque gets new use.
 Asheville, NC: The Kress building on Patton Avenue in Downtown Asheville was restored in the 1990s, and is now The Kress Emporium - a gallery featuring local artists, K2 Studio - a home and furniture store, as well as condominiums in the upper floors.
 Bakersfield, CA: The Kress building at 1401 19th St. in downtown Bakersfield has been converted to office space, with the exterior architecture, including Kress signage, still intact. 
 Baton Rouge, LA: The Kress building was scheduled to be demolished but was spared in 2005, and has been renovated for residential use.
 Berkeley, CA: The Kress building was converted into a discount bookstore, reversion date unknown.
 Biloxi, MS: The downtown Kress store was converted in 2014 into a live music venue, Kress Live.
 Brunswick, GA:  The Kress building was converted into a boutique hotel in 2023. The hotel also has a climbing gym, piano lounge, and rooftop restaurant. 
 Columbia, SC: The Kress building has been renovated into apartments with first floor restaurant and office space.
 Charleston, SC Kress store on King Street is now an H&M store
 Daytona Beach, FL: The Kress Building located on Beach Street downtown is restored with each floor having a different retro theme and is now home to many small businesses as well as a business center and shared office facility called Work Webb.
 Durham, NC: This 1933 Kress building is located downtown Durham on Main and Mangum streets. The building contains 14 residential condo units, converted in 2007 and 2 levels of commercial space. The building retains many Art Deco features such as metal elevators doors, crown moldings, high ceilings, and light fixtures. The exterior architecture, including Kress signage and unique ornamental designs are still intact. 
 Fort Worth, TX: The 1936 Kress building in downtown Fort Worth leases residential and office space.
 Florence, SC: The former Kress building is now a part of the Downtown Florence Revitalization Project. This building will house a new restaurant, named Town Hall, a rooftop bar, retail spaces, small condos, and office space. Many of the materials used in building these spaces came from the original building. The majority of the wood used in the project was reclaimed from original infrastructure and Kress store shelves - keeping the appearance as historically accurate as possible.
 Greensboro, NC: The former Kress building now houses TAVO Restaurant & Tavern, an office area along with a nightclub on the basement level and an entertainment area on the roof.
 Gastonia, NC: The former Kress building in downtown Gastonia now houses the second location of Sleepy Poet Antique Mall. Many of the original elements of the building were restored by Sleepy Poet.
 Greeley, CO Kress store on 8th Avenue and 9th Street is now an independent movie theater (since 2008). www.kresscinema.com
 Hilo, HI: In Hilo, Hawaii, a former Kress store has been renovated into Kress Cinema, a downtown movie theater.
 Huntsville, AL: the Kress in Downtown Huntsville closed and was boarded up for a while. In 2012  Fubar Nightclub opened on the main floor. A year later Miller's Tavern (a karaoke bar) was added and then in 2015 the basement was renovated to add Whiskey Bottom Saloon. The exterior of the building remains mostly original.
 Key West, FL: The Kress Building, located at 500 Duval Street, was home to the eccentric department store Fast Buck Freddie's from 1977 until 2013, and now is a 24-hour CVS drugstore.
 Lakeland, Fl: The Kress Building, located at 109 Kentucky Ave in Downtown Lakeland, is currently occupied by the Explorations V Children's Museum.
 Los Angeles: In July 2008, The Kress Hollywood nightclub and restaurant opened for a few years in the Kress building on Hollywood Boulevard. This former Kress store, built in 1934, served as the flagship Frederick's of Hollywood boutique for 59 years. A second location in south Los Angeles has also been repurposed. 
 Memphis, TN: The fourth Kress store built on Main Street is now guest rooms and the conference center for the adjoining SpringHill Suites hotel.
 Meridian, MS: The downtown Kress building is undergoing renovation and is slated to open in early 2016 as the new home of the Mississippi State University Meridian campus Kinesiology program. 
 Mobile, AL: The Kress building on Royal St. in Mobile houses the offices of The Alabama Media Group(Al.com) on the first two floors. The third floor is the contains the offices of the building's owner: Hargrove Engineers and Constructors. 
 Nashville, TN: The Kress store on 5th Avenue in downtown Nashville is now two loft complexes called Art Avenue Lofts and Kress Lofts.
 Orlando, FL: The Kres Chophouse restaurant occupies the downtown Orlando building.
 Pomona, CA:  The Kress building on Second Street in Downtown Pomona is now an Antique Market as part of Antique Row.
 Santa Rosa, CA: The 1932 Kress building at 615 4th Street houses a Mary's Pizza Shack.
 Savannah, GA: Was in operation until 1997. In 1998, it remained abandon until renovated and doubled in size and is now home to the Gap, a basement restaurant and residential apartments. The building still remains a very well known landmark to the local population.
 Seattle, WA: In June 2008, an IGA Supermarket, the Kress IGA, opened on the basement level of the former Kress store in downtown Seattle.
 Selma, AL: The Kress building on Broad Street in Downtown Selma was later converted in Butler Truax Jewelers. 
 Wichita, KS: The Kress building is now called the Kress Energy Center. This Kress Building is considered the best example of neo-gothic commercial architecture in Wichita. It is listed on city, state, and national registers of historic places.
 Yuma, AZ: In March 2010, The Kress Ultra Lounge nightclub and Da Boyz Italian Cuisine opened in the Kress building in downtown Yuma on Main Street.

The Kress IGA Supermarket in Seattle, Washington, Kress Hollywood, in Los Angeles, California and Kress Cinema in Hilo, Hawaii differ from many other re-purposed Kress locations due to their prominent use of the Kress name and logo as a component of the branding of the business.

See also
List of S. H. Kress and Co. buildings
Kress Building
S. H. Kress and Co. Building (Daytona Beach, Florida)
Kress Building (Fort Worth, Texas)

References

External links 

The evolution of a downtown corner.
Berkeley's Landmarks
 
The S.H. Kress & Company Collection at the National Building Museum

 
1896 establishments in Pennsylvania
Kress, S.H.
Kress, S.H.
Companies that filed for Chapter 11 bankruptcy in 1992
Companies that have filed for Chapter 7 bankruptcy
Retail companies disestablished in 1981
Retail companies established in 1896